Peter Hehir (born 1949) is an Australian actor. He is best known for his role as Bert Duggan on the soap opera The Sullivans from 1976 to 1978. His film appearances included Rikky and Pete (1988), The Girl Who Came Late (1991), Sweet Talker (1991), Return to the Blue Lagoon (1991), and The Boys (1998).

Filmography
The Boys (1998)
Return to the Blue Lagoon (1991)
Sweet Talker (1991)
The Girl Who Came Late (1991)
Rikky and Pete (1988)
Touch the Sun: Devil's Hill (1988) (TV)
Fortress (1986) (TV)
Kangaroo (1986)
Two Friends (1986) (TV)
I Live with Me Dad (1985)
A Street to Die (1985)
Cowra Breakout (1984) (TV)
Crime of the Decade (1984) (TV)
Fast Talking (1984)
Scales of Justice TV Series (1983)
Heatwave (1982)
The Last Outlaw TV Series (1980)
The Last of the Knucklemen (1979)
The Sullivans TV Series (1976–1983)

External links
 

1949 births
Living people
Australian male film actors
Australian male soap opera actors
Male actors from Brisbane